Ewald 'Kop' van der Westhuizen (born 3 April 1990 in Ladysmith, South Africa) is a South African rugby union player for    in the Currie Cup and in the Rugby Challenge. His regular position is prop.

Career

Youth and Varsity Cup rugby

The same year, he also played for the  side in the Under-19 Provincial Championship.

He moved to Johannesburg, where he represented the  side in the 2010 Under-21 Provincial Championship, making a solitary appearance.

Griquas

His performance in the Varsity Cup resulted in Kimberley-based side  drafting him into their side when they had an injury crisis during the 2013 Currie Cup Premier Division season.

He joined the side on a full-time basis in 2014. He played in all ten of their matches during the 2014 Vodacom Cup competition – starting nine of those – as the  won the competition for the fifth time.

He made four substitute appearances for Griquas during the 2014 Currie Cup qualification tournament, helping his side qualify for the 2014 Currie Cup Premier Division.

References

South African rugby union players
Living people
1990 births
People from Ladysmith, KwaZulu-Natal
Rugby union props
Griquas (rugby union) players
Cheetahs (rugby union) players
Stade Aurillacois Cantal Auvergne players
Yenisey-STM Krasnoyarsk players
Rugby union players from KwaZulu-Natal